β-Naphthol methyl ether, also called 2-methoxynaphthalene or yara yara, is a stabilizer found in gunpowder, particularly smokeless gunpowders. It is soluble in alcohol, and insoluble in water and dipropylene glycol.

Studies have also been done on the antiinflammatory effect of β-naphthol methyl ether and on how it behaves in time-resolved resonance Raman studies.

Synthesis and uses 
Nerolin can be prepared by alkylation of β-naphthol with dimethyl sulfate. It has a faint but persistent odor and used to be a scented compound found in soap and other products.

References

Naphthol ethers
2-Naphthyl compounds